Everyday behavior can refer to:
 Everyday life
 Everyday Behavior, 2004 music album by Mêlée